John Henry Morehead (December 3, 1861May 31, 1942) was an American politician who served as the 17th governor of Nebraska from 1913 to 1917.

Early life
Born on a farm in Lucas County, Iowa, Morehead attended business college and moved to Richardson County, Nebraska, in 1884.

Career 
After arriving in Nebraska, Morehead taught school, farmed, and banked, and eventually opened his own mercantile business.

Morehead moved to Falls City, Nebraska, where he and served as the first treasurer of Richardson County from 1896 to 1899. He was later the mayor of the city in 1900. He was elected to the Nebraska state senate in 1910 and served as its president pro tempore.

On May 2, 1911, the Lieutenant Governor of Nebraska, Melville R. Hopewell, died while in office. Although Morehead is not listed in recent editions of the Nebraska Blue Book as having served as Lieutenant Governor, multiple sources from the time indicate that after the death of Hopewell, Morehead was considered the Acting Lieutenant Governor due to his position as president pro tempore of the Nebraska Senate based on a misinterpretation of Article V, Section 18, of the Nebraska Constitution. (Article V, Section 18, of the Nebraska constitution at the time provided that "If there be no lieutenant governor..., the president [pro tempore] of the senate shall act as governor until the vacancy is filled, or the disability removed...." This would only take effect if the office of Governor of Nebraska was vacant and there was no Lieutenant Governor then in office to fill it. It should not have been applied to the case where only the office of lieutenant governor was vacant.) Thus, in the 1915 Nebraska Blue Book and the 1918 Nebraska Blue Book, Morehead is listed as having served as Lieutenant Governor. It is also said in a local newspaper account from the time that Morehead "became acting Lieutenant Governor of the state" and other newspaper accounts from the time referred to him as the "lieutenant governor" or "acting lieutenant governor." However, as soon as 1920, he was not being included in the list of Lieutenant Governors of Nebraska in the Nebraska Blue Book though editions of the Blue Book during the time that Morehead served as a US Representative stated that he had been the lieutenant governor in his biography while still failing to list him with the other lieutenant governors. In addition, some later editions of the Blue Book noted that Morehead was the President pro tempore during the time that the lieutenant governor's office was vacant.

In 1912, Morehead was elected Governor of Nebraska and served from 1913 to 1917. During his term, he was a delegate to the Democratic National Convention. As governor the state deficit was reduced and a workman's compensation law was sanctioned.

Morehead was the Democratic nominee in the 1918 United States Senate election in Nebraska and 1920 Nebraska gubernatorial election, losing both races.

Morehead was elected to the 68th congress (1923) and reelected five more times. He chaired the Committee on Memorials in the 72nd and 73rd congresses. He did not stand for reelection in 1934 and returned to farming and selling real estate. He was again a delegate to the Democratic National Convention in 1940.

Personal life
Morehead married Minnie Weisenreder on February 14, 1885, and they had two children. He died in St. Joseph, Missouri, in 1942. He is interred in Steele Cemetery, Falls City, Richardson County, Nebraska.

References

External links
 
 
 
 National Governors Association

1861 births
1942 deaths
Democratic Party governors of Nebraska
Lieutenant Governors of Nebraska
Democratic Party Nebraska state senators
Mayors of places in Nebraska
People from Lucas County, Iowa
People from Falls City, Nebraska
Democratic Party members of the United States House of Representatives from Nebraska